Cosberella lamaralexanderi, or the Lamar Alexander springtail, is a species of springtails native to the southern Appalachian Mountains of the United States.

It was discovered in 2006 by Dr. Earnest Bernard in Great Smoky Mountains National Park. He named it in honor of U.S. Senator Lamar Alexander of Tennessee because of his support of scientific research funding in the park and because the springtails' patterning is reminiscent of the plaid shirts that Alexander typically wears while campaigning.

References

External links
 
 Picture of C. lamaralexanderi

Collembola
Fauna of the Southeastern United States
Natural history of the Great Smoky Mountains
Animals described in 2006
Great Smoky Mountains National Park